Olena Hrytsyuk (born April 2, 1970) is a Ukrainian former swimmer, who specialized in sprint butterfly events. Hrystyuk competed for Ukraine in the women's 4×100 m medley relay at the 2000 Summer Olympics in Sydney. Teaming with Nadiya Beshevli, Svitlana Bondarenko, and Valentyna Trehub in heat three, Hrystyuk swam the butterfly leg and recorded a split of 1:02.77, but the Ukrainians settled only for seventh place and sixteenth overall in a final time of 4:15.64.

References

1970 births
Living people
Ukrainian female butterfly swimmers
Olympic swimmers of Ukraine
Swimmers at the 2000 Summer Olympics
21st-century Ukrainian women